Hemibagrus baramensis is a species of bagrid catfish found in northern Borneo.

References

Ng, P.K.L. and H.N. Ng, 1995. Hemibagrus gracilis, a new species of large riverine catfish (Teleostei: Bagridae) from Peninsular Malaysia. Raffles Bull. Zool. 43(1):133-142.

Bagridae
Taxa named by Charles Tate Regan
Fish described in 1906